Paige Rydberg (born November 17, 1999) is an American figure skater. She is the 2017 Philadelphia Summer International junior silver medalist. Paige is a University of Colorado- Colorado Springs Alum and graduated with a B.A. in Strategic Communications.

Results

References 

1999 births
American female single skaters
Living people
Sportspeople from the Chicago metropolitan area
21st-century American women